Philosophical Explorations is a peer reviewed philosophy journal published triannually, specializing in the philosophy of mind and action.

The editors of this journal intend to "publish outstanding articles in the philosophy of mind and action, with an emphasis on issues concerning the interrelations between cognition and agency." They are particularly interested in publishing articles on "philosophy of mind and action and related disciplines such as moral psychology, ethics, philosophical anthropology, social philosophy, political philosophy and philosophy of the social sciences....[and] interdisciplinary [work], establishing bridges between philosophy and, for example, evolutionary biology, neuroscience, psychology, and political science. In 2010, the journal initiated the Philosophical Explorations Essay Prize.

Since 2007, the Editor in Chief is Anthonie Meijers of Eindhoven University of Technology.

Submissions to Philosophical Explorations are screened by the (associate) editors and undergo double blind peer review by at least two referees before being accepted for publication.

References

External links
 Link to recent journal content 
 Philosophical Explorations: Publishers information, Taylor and Francis

Philosophy journals
English-language journals
Taylor & Francis academic journals
Triannual journals